Christopher Perrin (born 1961) is a publisher, educator, speaker, and writer. He is the CEO and cofounder of Classical Academic Press (a classical education curriculum, media, and consulting company started in 2001) and speaks regularly at schools, conferences, and homeschool conventions as well as serving as a consultant for over 55 schools in 26 states. Perrin has written for The Gospel Coalition and National Review and been cited in Christianity Today. He heads up the The TrueNorth Podcast Network with The Christopher Perrin Show.

Career and education

Christopher Perrin became involved with the Classical education movement in 1996 as the founding headmaster (and Latin teacher) for a classical Christian school in Harrisburg, Pennsylvania (Covenant Christian Academy). He has served with the Society of Classical Learning (Board Vice-Chair) and is currently President of the Alcuin Fellowship.

Authoring An Introduction to Classical Education: A Guide for Parents in 2004, Perrin has also written curriculum: Greek For Children Primer A, the Greek Alphabet Code Cracker, and co-authorship of the Latin for Children series (for which he  also recorded video instruction).

Classical Academic Press has published The Liberal Arts Tradition: A Philosophy of Classical Christian Education by Kevin Clark and Ravi Jain with a foreword by Peter Kreeft (2021, 3rd edition), The Myth Made Fact: Reading Greek and Roman Mythology through Christian Eyes by Louis Markos (2020), and The Black Intellectual Tradition: Reading Freedom in Classical Literature by Angel Adams Parham and Anika Prather (2022).

Perrin has a B.A. in history (with a classics minor) from the University of South Carolina as well as a Master of Arts in Liberal Arts from St. John's College and an M.Div and Ph.D. from Westminster Theological Seminary (writing his thesis on the apologetics of G. K. Chesterton).

Personal life

Christopher Perrin is married to poet, author, and college educator Christine Perrin. He and his wife have three children and live near Harrisburg, Pennsylvania.

References

External links 
 Renewing Classical Education, subscription newsletter by Christopher Perrin
 Classical Academic Press, publishing and media company cofounded by Christopher Perrin 
 TrueNorth Podcast Network, podcast network headed up by Christopher Perrin
 The Alcuin Fellowship, fellowship where Christopher Perrin serves as president

American publishers (people)
21st-century publishers (people)
Education in the United States
Homeschooling
American writers
Living people
1961 births
Editors of Christian publications
American chief executives